The Wag Islands are an uninhabited Canadian arctic islands group in Kivalliq Region, Nunavut, Canada. They are irregularly shaped and are located at the mouth of Chesterfield Inlet.

References

Islands of Chesterfield Inlet
Uninhabited islands of Kivalliq Region